STAC may refer to:

Computers and electronics
 stac (Set AC Flag) instruction on x86 CPUs, part of Supervisor Mode Access Prevention
 Stac Electronics, a former American technology company
 Lempel–Ziv–Stac, a data compression algorithm developed by Stac Electronics
 SigmaTel Audio Codec
 an extended version of the Graphic Adventure Creator software
 SpatioTemporal Asset Catalog, an open specification to describe geospatial information

Education
 Southern Theatre Arts Centre, a training venue in Durrington by Sea, Worthing, West Sussex, England
 St. Thomas Aquinas College, Sparkill, New York
 Saint Thomas Aquinas College (Sogod), Southern Leyte, Philippines
 St Andrew's College, Christchurch, New Zealand

Transportation
 Service des transports de l'agglomération chambérienne (Stac), a transport service in Chambéry, France; part of Compagnie générale française des transports et entreprises
 Service de transport adapté de la Capitale, a transport service in Quebec, Canada
 Special Transit Advisory Commission, a commission that founded the Triangle Transit transport service in North Carolina, United States
 STAC Swiss Government Flights, see List of airline codes (S)
 Supersonic Transport Aircraft Committee

Other uses
 STAC (protein), a protein containing a C1 domain
 Sepak Takraw Association of Canada, a sport association
 Sirtuin-activating compound, a class of biochemical compounds
 Spatial and Temporal Analysis of Crime, see Crime hotspots
 Stac, the Gaelic word for a sea stack, commonly used in Scotland

See also
 STACS